Roger McLachlan (born 15 January 1954) is a New Zealand bass guitarist based in Australia. He was an early bass player for Little River Band.

Early life
McLachlan was born on 15 January 1954 in the small town of Riverton, near Invercargill, New Zealand. He came to Australia in 1974 to join the touring band for the stage musical Godspell.

Little River Band
In 1975, McLachlan was invited to join the supergroup Little River Band, replacing the short tenure of Dave Orams. He appeared on the first two albums Little River Band and After Hours, and toured extensively, making 311 appearances with the band. He was replaced by George McArdle in 1976. By 1998, all original members of Little River Band had left. Guitarist Stephen Housden revived the band, and asked McLachlan to re-join. He remained with the band for a year, until the pressure of touring in the United States led him to depart again.

Subsequent career
McLachlan joined country-rock outfit Stars in 1976, remaining with them into 1977.

He is part of the Stars re-formed lineup of 2019.

References 

1954 births
Living people
New Zealand bass guitarists
Male bass guitarists
New Zealand rock musicians
Little River Band members
New Zealand expatriates in Australia
New Zealand male guitarists
New Zealand guitarists